Donald Richard Colo (January 5, 1925 – June 23, 2019) was an American football defensive tackle who played nine seasons in the National Football League (NFL). He was born in East Bridgewater, Massachusetts. He served in the US Navy during World War II. He died at the age of 94 on June 23, 2019.

References

1925 births
2019 deaths
American football defensive tackles
Baltimore Colts (1947–1950) players
New York Yanks players
Dallas Texans (NFL) players
Cleveland Browns players
Eastern Conference Pro Bowl players
Brown Bears football players
People from East Bridgewater, Massachusetts
Players of American football from Massachusetts
Sportspeople from Plymouth County, Massachusetts